King Art Games (stylized as KING Art Games) is a German video game developer. The company created the point-and-click adventure The Book of Unwritten Tales, including its prequel called The Critter Chronicles and the sequel The Book of Unwritten Tales 2. Their other project that uses similar gameplay mechanics, is the point-and-click adventure The Raven: Legacy of a Master Thief.

They have developed the turn-based strategy game Battle Worlds: Kronos. The studio also worked on the tactical role-playing game The Dwarves, which is based on the novel of the same name. Jan Theysen and Marc König established King Art Games in 2000 to focus on graphic adventure games and role-playing video games.

In January 2020 their Iron Harvest game won the "Best German Game" award at the Deutscher Entwickler Preis, and the developer team also won "Best Game Design" and "Best Sound Design" and was nominated for "Best Graphic" and "Best Story".

Games developed

Browser and mobile games
Murphy’s Law
Drivals
My Free Zoo
My Fantastic Park
My Little Farmies
Undermaster
Inkheart (2009), Nintendo DS

2011 to present

See also
Daedalic Entertainment – German adventure game developer
House of Tales – German adventure game developer

References

External links
 Official website

Companies based in Bremen
Video game companies established in 2000
German companies established in 2000
Video game companies of Germany
Video game development companies